Chavdar may refer to:

Places
 Chavdar Municipality, Sofia Province, Bulgaria
 Chavdar, Sofia Province, a village in Bulgaria
 Chavdar, Smolyan Province, a village in Bulgaria
 Chavdar Peninsula, Antarctica

People with the given name
 Chavdar Atanasov (born 1973), Bulgarian footballer
 Chavdar Djurov (1946–1972), Bulgarian pilot and skydiver
 Chavdar Tsvetkov (born 1953), Bulgarian footballer
 Chavdar Voyvoda, 16th-century Bulgarian rebel leader
 Chavdar Yankov (born 1984), Bulgarian footballer
 Tchavdar Georgiev is a writer, US producer, director and editor of films

Other uses
 Chavdar (company), a Bulgarian coachbuilder
 Chavdar Partisan Brigade, a Bulgarian partisan group of World War II
 PFC Chavdar Byala Slatina, a Bulgarian football club
 PFC Chavdar Etropole, a Bulgarian football club

See also
 Chavdartsi (disambiguation)